Zolotarevo is a village located in the Khust Raion of Zakarpattia Oblast (province) of western Ukraine.

The population at the 2001 census was 4,266 people. The village is governed by a council. The head of the council is Ivan Mikhailovich Babich.

The village used to have a fruit factory.

Zolotarevo has been twinned with Newport-on-Tay since 2002.

Name
According to one legend, the first goldsmiths in the village were good masters, made various dishes from the plates, and hammered for weaving. They also performed carpentry and blacksmithing works, for which they were called "goldsmiths", which means they had "golden hands".

History
The first written mention of the village dates was 1616. This was described by a village teacher Omelyan Belinsky in 1938 in his historical chronicle of the village. He wrote, "It is spread over the picturesque multi-level landscapes of the gray smoky Carpathians: hills, valleys, hills and many streams. In spring it sinks in apple-pink-white flowers, in summer—in a fabulous variety of Carpathian flowers, in autumn—in delicious, aromatic fruits of apples – ferkovani, and in winter the same apple-trees, shrouded in silver frost and white dazzling snow." It has been historically an ethnically Rusyn village.

During the time that the area was part of Kingdom of Hungary, the village was located in the district of Huszt, Máramaros County.

In April 1944 Jews of Zolotarevo were deported to the ghetto in nearby Khust prior to being deported them to Auschwitz at the end of May.

Churches
There are four churches in the area around Zolotarevo.

The oldest is the Greek Catholic Church at the northeast side of the village. The Greek Catholic Church of John the Baptist Cathedral was founded in 1865. Inside is a painting of "The Last Supper", the work of an Italian master, and four icons: Jesus Christ, Blessed Virgin Mary, St. St. Nicholas the Wonderworker and St. John the Baptist, as well as a picturesque iconostasis with "royal gates" and images of archangels, apostles and other saints. A bell tower was built near the church. Not far from the temple is a church lighthouse (built in 1863) and a chapel (built in 1860). The lighthouse was erected for the priests' residence and for the educational activities of the children. In Soviet times it was used as a school and as a hostel for children from remote parts of the village. The chapel was erected at the expense of goldsmiths who worked in America. At the request of the wage earners, five crosses of hewn stone were made for the remnants of these funds.

A newer Russian Orthodox church is near the center of the village on a side road.

Notable people
 Mikhailo Deyak – artist
 Vasyl Mykhailovych Dovhovych (1783–1849) – historian, priest 
 Oleksandr Slyvka (1909–2008) – author of the Khust National Theater

Gallery

References

 
 

Villages in Khust Raion
Carpatho-Ukraine